Robbins Glacier is a broad glacier flowing into the head of Peale Inlet on the north side of Thurston Island. Named by Advisory Committee on Antarctic Names (US-ACAN) after Aviation Radarman James Haskin Robbins of the Eastern Group of U.S. Navy Operation Highjump, aircrewman in the PBM Mariner seaplane that crashed on adjacent Noville Peninsula, December 30, 1946. His energy and initiative contributed to the well-being of six survivors who were rescued Jan 12, 1947 (Ball Peninsula, Mount Howell).

See also
 List of glaciers in the Antarctic
 Glaciology

Maps
 Thurston Island – Jones Mountains. 1:500000 Antarctica Sketch Map. US Geological Survey, 1967.
 Antarctic Digital Database (ADD). Scale 1:250000 topographic map of Antarctica. Scientific Committee on Antarctic Research (SCAR). Since 1993, regularly upgraded and updated.

References
 

Glaciers of Thurston Island